Urban Bush Women (UBW), founded in 1984 by Jawole Willa Jo Zollar, is a Brooklyn, New York-based non-profit dance company and professional African-American women's dance company. The ensemble performs choreography by Zollar and a several other choreographers, often with a focus on the experiences of women of African descent.

About 
Urban Bush Women galvanizes artists, activists, audiences, and communities through performances, artist development, education, and community engagement. Their programs include the Summer Leadership Institute (SLI), BOLD (Builders, Organizers & Leaders through Dance) and the Choreographic Center Initiative. UBW affects the overall ecology of the arts by promoting artistic legacies; projecting the voices of the under-heard and people of color; bringing attention to and addressing issues of equity in the dance field and throughout the United States; and by providing platforms and serving as a conduit for experimental art makers.

Complete Works 
2016 -

 SCAT!

2015 -

 Walking With ‘Trane Side A & B

2014 -

 Hep Hep Sweet Sweet
 Walking With 'Trane, Chapter 2
 dark swan
 Chalabati

2010 -

 Zollar: Uncensored
 Body Talk

2009 -

 Naked City

1995

 Batty Moves

Awards
The company has been commissioned by presenters nationwide, and includes among its honors a New York Dance and Performance Award (“Bessie”); the Capezio Award for Outstanding Achievement in Dance; and two 2004 Doris Duke Awards for New Work from the American Dance Festival. In March 2010, UBW toured South America as part of DanceMotion USA, a cultural diplomacy initiative spearheaded by the U.S. Department of State's Bureau of Educational and Cultural Affairs and the Brooklyn Academy of Music.

In 2016, the company was awarded the Dance/USA Honor Award. The company received the Bessie Lifetime Achievement in Dance Award in 2017.

Productions
UBW has performed in New York City and throughout the United States, as well as Asia, Australia, Canada, Germany, South America, Europe and Senegal (in collaboration with Germaine Acogny and her all-male Compagnie JANT-BI).

Performances in the USA include Jacob's Pillow, Spoleto USA, National Black Arts Festival, Dance Umbrella UK, and Lincoln Center. The company's repertory consists of 33 works choreographed by Zollar including ambitious collaborations with jazz artist David Murray; poets Laurie Carlos and Carl Hancock Rux; directors Steve Kent and Elizabeth Herron; and the National Song and Dance Company of Mozambique (supported by The Ford Foundation's Africa Exchange Program).

References

1984 establishments in New York City
Dance companies in New York City
Culture of Brooklyn
African-American dance